Ostroh is a historic city located in Rivne Oblast (province) of western Ukraine, on the Horyn River. Ostroh is the administrative center of the Ostroh Raion (district). Administratively, Ostroh is incorporated as a city of oblast significance and does not belong to the raion. Population: 

The Ostroh Academy was established here in 1576, the first higher educational institution in modern Ukraine. Furthermore, in the 16th century, the first East Slavic books, notably the Ostrog Bible, were printed there.

History

The Hypatian Codex first mentions Ostroh in 1100, as a fortress of the Volhynian princes. Since the 14th century, it was the seat of the powerful Ostrogski princely family, who developed their town into a great centre of learning and commerce. Upon the family's demise in the 17th century, Ostroh passed to the Zasławski and then Lubomirski families.

In the second half of the 14th century, Ostroh, together with the whole of Volhynia, was administratively integrated into the Grand Duchy of Lithuania. Following the Union of Lublin (1569), the town became part of the Crown of the Kingdom of Poland, where it remained until the late 18th century (see Partitions of Poland). Ostroh, known in Polish as Ostróg, received Magdeburg rights in 1585. In the 17th century, the town was surrounded by fortifications, with a moat, a rampart with five bastions. In 1609–1753, it was the capital of the Ostrogski family fee tail, founded by Voivode Janusz Ostrogski, who invited Bernardine monks to Ostróg. Furthermore, the town had a Calvinist academy; among its lecturers was Andrzej Wegierski.

During the Khmelnytsky Uprising, the town was torched by the Cossacks, and its Jewish residents were brutally murdered. The Great Maharsha Synagogue, built in 1627, was damaged during this period. Ostróg slowly recovered, and in the second half of the 18th century, it became the site of a Jesuit college (see Collegium Nobilium). In 1793, the town was forcibly annexed by the Russian Empire, where it remained until 1918. Railroad lines, built in the 19th century, missed Ostróg, and as a result, the town stagnated. The railway station serving the area was built in 1873, 14km away, in the village of Ożenin.

In the interbellum period, Ostróg belonged to the County of Zdołbunów, Volhynian Voivodeship of the Second Polish Republic. It was an important garrison town for the Polish Army, and the Border Protection Corps (KOP). The KOP Battalion "Ostróg" was stationed there, along with the 19th Volhynian Uhlan Regiment. On July 7, 1920, during the Polish–Soviet War, it was the site of a battle between a Polish unit under Wincenty Krajowski, and the Bolsheviks of Semyon Budyonny's  1st Cavalry Army. Throughout 1919–1939 Ostróg was located in close to the Polish–Soviet border, and special passes were required to enter some districts of the town.

Following the 1939 Soviet invasion of Poland, Ostróg was annexed by the Soviet Union, as part of the Ukrainian Soviet Socialist Republic. An unknown number of the town's residents were forcibly sent to Siberia.

The Nazi German occupation of southern Soviet Union resulted in the establishment of the Reichskommissariat Ukraine (RKU), with headquarters in Rivne. In the autumn of 1941 several large-scale mass murders took place in Volhynia-Poldolia. On 1 September 1941 2,500 Jews were shot in Ostróg. Six weeks later the ghetto was disbanded and another 3,000 people were killed. During the first six months of the German-Soviet war 300,000 Jews were killed in the territory of the Ukrainian Soviet Socialist Republic. In total 1,430,000 Ukrainian Jews were murdered in the Holocaust.

In 2022, an informal sister city arrangement was established with Beaufort, South Carolina in the United States in which the residents of Beaufort raised funds to support  Ostroh during the Russian invasion of Ukraine.  

Landmarks include Ostroh Castle on the Red Hill, with the church of the Epiphany (built in the fifteenth century) and several towers (Tatar Gate Tower and Roun "New" Tower). To the north-west from the castle stand two sixteenth-century towers. The suburb of Mezhirichi contains the Abbey of the Trinity, with a fifteenth-century cathedral and other ancient buildings.

See also
 Ostrogski family
 Ivan Fyodorov (printer)
 Ostroh Castle
 Ostroh Academy
 National University Ostroh Academy
 Uherský Ostroh

References

External links

 
 
 

Cities in Rivne Oblast
Ostrozhsky Uyezd
Wołyń Voivodeship (1921–1939)
Shtetls
Cities of regional significance in Ukraine
Volhynian Voivodeship (1569–1795)
Jewish communities destroyed in the Holocaust